Agriopoma texasiana, the Texas Venus clam, is a species of bivalve mollusc in the family Veneridae. It can be found in the Gulf of Mexico from Florida to Texas.

References

Veneridae
Molluscs described in 1892